Manohar Sharma (born 8 August 1940) is an Indian former first-class cricketer who played for Madhya Pradesh and Services. He is the author of the book Humour in Cricket.

Career
Appearing in 66 first-class matches from 1959/60 to 1975/76, Sharma played as a right-handed batsman who usually opened the innings. He was also an occasional wicket-keeper, apart from being a part-time off break bowler. He made 3733 runs at an average of more than 37 including nine centuries in his first-class career. He played most of his cricket for Madhya Pradesh and Services in the Ranji Trophy, while also making appearances for Hyderabad Cricket Association XI in the Moin-ud-Dowlah Gold Cup Tournament. He was never selected for the Indian team although being a regular member of Central Zone and North Zone teams in the Duleep Trophy.

In 2010, a book authored by Sharma called Humour in Cricket was released. Sharma has worked as the vice president of the Madhya Pradesh Cricket Association and chairman of its cricket development committee. As of 2015, he is the president of the Hyderabad State Veterans Cricket Association.

References

External links 
 
 

1940 births
Living people
Indian cricketers
Madhya Pradesh cricketers
Services cricketers
North Zone cricketers
Central Zone cricketers
Hyderabad cricketers
Indian cricket administrators
Wicket-keepers